William Lachlan Mark Lewis (15 September 1874 - 10 May 1940) was an Australian rules footballer who played with Carlton in the Victorian Football League (VFL).

Notes

External links 
		

Bill Lewis's profile at Blueseum

1874 births
1940 deaths
Australian rules footballers from Victoria (Australia)
Carlton Football Club players